Dale Turner may refer to:

 Dale Turner (cricketer), Australian cricketer
 Dale Turner (trumpeter), American trumpet player with the American new wave band Oingo Boingo
 Dale Turner (songwriter), American singer-songwriter, rock musician, and multi-instrumentalist/record producer
Dale Turner (Jericho), fictional character
Dale Turner, a fictional jazz musician in the 1986 film Round Midnight